is the tenth single by Japanese idol duo Wink. Written by Neko Oikawa and Anri Sekine, the single was released on March 20, 1991, by Polystar Records.

Background and release 
According to lyricist Neko Oikawa, she got the idea of the title "Kitto Atsui Kuchibiru (Remain)" from a manga she saw somewhere.

"Kitto Atsui Kuchibiru (Remain)" became Wink's third consecutive single to peak at No. 2 on the Oricon's weekly charts. It sold over 175,000 copies.

Track listing 
All lyrics are written by Neko Oikawa; all music is arranged by Satoshi Kadokura.

Chart positions 
Weekly charts

Year-end charts

References

External links 
 
 

1991 singles
1991 songs
Wink (duo) songs
Japanese-language songs
Songs with lyrics by Neko Oikawa